Mashkul (also Romanized as Mashkūl; also known as Abvar, Mashgūl, Mashkyu, and Mashkyul’) is a village in Sanjabad-e Jonubi Rural District, Firuz District, Kowsar County, Ardabil Province, Iran. At the 2006 census, its population was 165, in 36 families.

References 

Towns and villages in Kowsar County